The 2008 San Jose State Spartans football team represented San Jose State University in the 2008 NCAA Division I FBS football season. This season was the Spartans' fourth season with Dick Tomey as head coach.

Schedule

Game summaries

UC Davis

at Nebraska

San Diego State

at Stanford

at Hawaii

Utah State

at New Mexico State

No. 13 Boise State

at Idaho

Louisiana Tech

at Nevada

Fresno State

References

San Jose State
San Jose State Spartans football seasons
San Jose State Spartans football